Cronquist can refer to:
 Arthur J. Cronquist, a North American botanist (1919–1992).
 The Cronquist system, a system attributed to Arthur J. Cronquist. Many authors use their own variation of this system, which they also refer to as the Cronquist system. Cronquist himself published An Integrated System of Classification of Flowering Plants (1981) and The Evolution and Classification of Flowering Plants (1988).